Yves Galland  (born 8 March 1941 in Paris), is a French politician and entrepreneur.

Biography 
After his studies in law from Paris University, Yves Galland started his career in the world of business before also starting his political career. He became a member of the European Parliament, from 1979 to 1986, and again in 1989 to 1995, where he represented the Union for French Democracy (UDF) and the Radical Party. From 1989 to 1992, Galland was Vice President of the European Parliament under President Egon Klepsch. From 1992 to 1994, he was chairman of the Liberal and Democratic Reformist Group, succeeding Valéry Giscard d'Estaing.

References

External links 
Entretien sur RFI à la veille du salon du Bourget (French)
Entretien avec Économie matin (French)

1941 births
Living people
Politicians from Paris
Radical Party (France) politicians
Businesspeople from Paris
Union for French Democracy MEPs